Jack Nelson may refer to:
Jack Nelson (actor) (1882–1948), American actor and film director.
Jack Nelson (swimmer) (1931–2014), American swimmer and swimming coach.
Jack Nelson (journalist) (1929–2009), American journalist.
Jack Nelson (American football) (1927–1978), American football coach.
Jack Nelson (1948 - 2020), manager of rock bands Queen, Black Sabbath and others.

See also
Jack Nelsen, Idaho politician
Jack Nelson-Pallmeyer (born 1951), American academic
John Nelson (disambiguation)